The National Assembly is the lower house of the Parliament of the Central African Republic. Members are elected in single-member constituencies using the two-round (or Run-off) system. Members serve five-year terms.

History
The National Assembly formed following elections held on 13 March and 8 May 2005, and had a total of 105 members.

The legislature of the Central African Republic was previously (at least as of 1990) a bicameral institution known as Congress, of which the National Assembly was the lower house; the upper house was called the Economic and Regional Council (French: Conseil Economique et Regional).

The National Assembly will be dissolved by Jan 11, 2014 and new legislative elections will be held, according to a ceasefire agreement signed between the government and the Seleka rebel coalition on Jan 11, 2013 in Libreville, Gabon. According to the agreement, a national unity government will be formed and a prime minister will be chosen from the opposition parties.

The National Assembly is the lower house of the Parliament of the Central African Republic since the ratification of the Constitution of the Central African Republic on March 27, 2016.

See also
History of the Central African Republic
Politics of the Central African Republic
List of national legislatures
List of presidents of the National Assembly of the Central African Republic

References

Government of the Central African Republic
Politics of the Central African Republic
Political organisations based in the Central African Republic
Central African Republic